Soay Sound is a strait separating the islands of Soay Mòr and Soay Beag from the northern part of Harris. The sound is part of West Loch Tarbert.

References

Harris, Outer Hebrides
Straits of Scotland
Landforms of the Outer Hebrides